Hespagarista is a genus of moths of the family Noctuidae. The genus was erected by Francis Walker in 1854.

Species
Hespagarista caudata (Dewitz, 1879) Angola, Congo, Zaire, Guinea, Malawi, Tanzania, Zambia
Hespagarista eburnea Jordan, 1915 Tanzania, Zambia, Zaire
Hespagarista echione (Boisduval, 1847) Kenya, Burundi, Malawi, Tanzania, Mozambique, S.Africa

References

Agaristinae